The Runner is the independent student newspaper of Kwantlen Polytechnic University's 17,500-plus students, faculty and staff across Surrey, Richmond, Langley, Delta, and White Rock. It publishes 18 issues each year on both weekly and bi-weekly schedules between September and April. Summer issues are published monthly during May through August. The Runner withdrew as a member of the Canadian University Press in 2013.

Background 

The Runner first published in early 2009 after a successful February 2008 Kwantlen Student Association referendum for "a freely distributed, year-round, multi-campus, student-owned, student-run news and campus culture publication", which approved a $0.75 per credit levy that is refundable to students who may "opt out". Other funds supplement The Runner through advertisement sales.

It has formal, exclusive financial and editorial autonomy from the Kwantlen Student Association. Such autonomy avoids press freedom hindrance, where student unions or post-secondary institutions attempt to exert control over the content or funding of a student newspaper that commits journalism in the public interest.

Organization 
A board of directors maintains the general direction of The Runner. It is the independent oversight for both editorial and business divisions. It functions under the umbrella of British Columbia's Society Act as a registered non-profit society named Polytechnic Ink Publishing Society (abbreviated as PIPS). Kwantlen students are the voting members of the society, and they may opt out from it and receive a refund of their fee payment.

The Runner's editorial functions work as a collective; there is neither Managing Editor nor an Editor-in-Chief position. Each editor has delegated duties and tasks from the Editorial Division, while other general decisions are made by general votes or consensus from Contributors at meetings.

Runner editors are elected each June by the paper's "Contributors". Collectively, Contributors make up the society's editorial division and vote on all aspects of editorial policies, content and views. Contributors are student writers, photographers and illustrators who have had three of their submissions published within The Runner or other PIPS publications over the course of a calendar year.

The Runner also employs an operations manager who coordinates society human resources, day-to-day functions, and is in charge of the society's Business Division. The operations manager is not a board member, but attends meetings, and generally serves the society with its institutional memory.

See also 
 Canadian University Press
 List of student newspapers in Canada
 List of newspapers in Canada
 Kwantlen Polytechnic University

Notes

External links 
 The Runner
 The Runner on Twitter
 The Runner on Facebook

Kwantlen Polytechnic University
Student newspapers published in British Columbia
Newspapers published in Vancouver
Publications established in 2008
2008 establishments in British Columbia